Omar Lamont Brown (born March 28, 1975) is a former American football defensive back who played two seasons with the Atlanta Falcons of the National Football League. He was drafted by the Atlanta Falcons in the fourth round of the 1998 NFL Draft. He played college football at the University of North Carolina at Chapel Hill and attended William Penn High School in York, Pennsylvania. Brown was also a member of the Orlando Rage of the XFL.

References

External links
Just Sports Stats
XFL profile

Living people
1975 births
Players of American football from Pennsylvania
American football defensive backs
African-American players of American football
North Carolina Tar Heels football players
Atlanta Falcons players
Orlando Rage players
Sportspeople from York, Pennsylvania
21st-century African-American sportspeople
20th-century African-American sportspeople